The 1977 Season's Cup became the first edition of Season's Cup, an annual football match contested by the winners of the previous season's Soviet Top League and Soviet Cup competitions.

The match was played at the Stadion Dinamo imeni Lenina, Tbilisi, on 20 November 1977, and contested by league winner Dinamo Kiev and cup winner Dinamo Moscow. Dinamo Moscow won it 1–0.

Match

Details

1977
1977 in Soviet football
FC Dynamo Kyiv matches
FC Dynamo Moscow matches
Sport in Tbilisi
November 1977 sports events in Europe